Marsa Matruh International Airport, formerly Mersa Matruh Airport , is an international airport in Mersa Matruh, Egypt. In 2011, the airport served 99,515 passengers (−13.7% compared to 2010).

Airlines and destinations

Military operations 
Mersa Matruh Air Base (possibly collocated with the civilian field) hosts the 102nd Tactical Fighter Brigade, with 26 Squadron flying the F-7 and FT-7 and an 82 Squadron detachment flying the Mirage 2000BM and 2000EM.

See also 
Transport in Egypt
List of airports in Egypt

References

External links 
 
 
OurAirports - Mersa Matruh

Airports in Egypt
Egyptian Air Force bases
Mersa Matruh